Rosy Business is a 2009 Hong Kong period television drama produced by Lee Tim-sing and TVB. Comprising 25 episodes, it originally aired on the Jade network from 27 April to 29 May 2009. 

Set in Eastern China during the mid-19th century, Rosy Business follows the mercantile Chiang family, owners of Wuxi's largest rice business Hing Fung Nin. After falling ill, patriarch Chiang Kiu temporarily hands over his leadership to his fourth wife Hong Po-kei, which incurs conflict with his other wives and sons. Meanwhile the impoverished coolie Chai Kau becomes an important figure in assisting Hong Po-kei in protecting the family business from crumbling during the Taiping Rebellion. The script was inspired by the successful Chinese television series The Grand Mansion Gate (Chinese: 大宅門).

The final two episodes were aired back-to-back as a two-hour finale, including a cast interview with Scoop (東張西望). A commercial success, the final week of broadcast peaked at 47 TVRs with 3 million live viewers, becoming the second highest-rated television drama in Hong Kong of 2009. It stars Best Actress winners Sheren Tang, Nancy Wu, and Kara Wai. Rosy Business received twelve TVB Anniversary Award nominations and eight top 5 nominations, winning six of them, becoming the biggest winner of the year. The awards include Best Drama, Best Actress (Sheren Tang), Best Actor (Wayne Lai), Best Supporting Actress (Susan Tse), My Favourite Male Character (Lai), and Most Improved Male Artiste (Ngo Ka-nin). An indirect sequel, No Regrets, was released as a grand production and TVB's anniversary series in 2010.

Synopsis
In the mid-1830s, a natural disaster strikes the city of Nantong, tarnishing most of the city's rice fields. Running out of food supply, city mayor Hong Chi-wing (Wong Wai Leung) decides to use the city's military food supply to feed the people. A few days after the disaster, an official from Beijing arrives to the city to check the military supply, and upon seeing empty trailers, he sentences the Hong family to death. His daughter Hong Po-yin (Sheren Tang) escapes and becomes a maid in Prince Wai's mansion, living under the name Hong Po-kei.

Twenty years later, Po-kei reunites with the rich rice merchant Chiang Kiu (Elliot Ngok) at his manor in Wuxi, whom she was betrothed to before the disaster. Chiang Kiu's wife, Yan Fung-yee (Susan Tse) recognizes Po-kei and reveals her identity to Prince Wai, who was there for a visit. Kiu manages to convince the Prince to free her, and marries Po-kei as his fourth wife. Appreciating Po-kei's wisdom and persistence, he entrusts the business to her, with the reason that his eldest son, Bit-man (Ngo Ka-nin), is not yet ready to succeed him. Hungry for power and eager to keep tradition, Fung-yee attempts to strip Po-kei from power but Po-kei manages to keep the business in good shape. She is impressed with second son Bit-ching's (Ron Ng) intelligence and guides him to become the successor, but her efforts are met with challenges from an employee, Chai Kau (Wayne Lai).

Cast and characters

Main 
Sheren Tang as Hong Po-kei / Hong Po-yin, an intelligent, selfless and compassionate woman who escapes her family's execution, eventually becoming Chiang Kiu's fourth wife and helps manage the Hing Fung Nin rice business.
Angel Chiang as Young Hong Po-kei
Wayne Lai as Chai Kau, a smart but arrogant and reckless man who becomes Hing Fung Nin's employee. Kau always gets himself into trouble and is vengeful to those who have wronged him but his loyalty to Po-kei changes him.
Elliot Ngok as Chiang Kiu, owner of Hing Fung Nin, husband to Yan Fung-yee, Pang Giu, Lau Fong and Po-kei and father of Chiang Bit-man, Chiang Bit-chiang and Chiang Bit-mo.
Stephen Wong as Young Chiang Kiu
Susan Tse as Yan Fung-yee, Chiang Kiu's first wife and Bit-man's mother
Jess Shum as Young Yan Fung-yee
Kiki Sheung as Pang Giu, Chiang Kiu's second wife (actually should be third wife) and Bit-mo's mother
Josephine Shum as Young Pang Giu
Kara Hui as Lau Fong, Chiang Kiu's third wife (originally second wife) and Bit-ching's mother
Summer Joe as Young Lau Fong
Ron Ng as Chiang Bit-ching, Chiang Kiu's second eldest son with Lau Fong and later Yau Man's husband
Lawrence Ng Lok Wang as Young Chiang Bit-ching
Ngo Ka-nin as Chiang Bit-man, Chiang Kiu's eldest son with Fung Yee
Timothy Ip as Young Chiang Bit-man
Kelvin Leung as Chiang Bit-mo, Chiang Kiu's youngest son with Pang Giu
Cadmus Chan as Young Chiang Bit-mo
Henry Lee as Pang Hang, Pang Giu's older brother and Bit-mo's uncle
Oscar Leung as Young Pang Hang
Suki Chui as Yau Man, Yuk-hing's daughter and later Bit-ching's wife
Helen Ma as Ngan Yuk-hing, Yau Man's mother
Nancy Wu as Suen Hoi-tong, one of Pang Hang's girlfriends and later Chai Kau's concubine

Supporting 
Suet Nei as Gui Yuk-yu, Chiang Kiu's mother
Kwok Fung as Prince Wai / Mianyu, Qing Dynasty's Prince Hui of the First Rank
Chang Yi as Lee Cheung-fat, Hing Fung Nin's manager and Bit-man's godfather
Ben Wong as Chiu Yat-ming, general of the Taiping Heavenly Kingdom
Kwan Ching as Sa Tsun Tin, leader of the Sa bandits and later owner of Tsun Tin's Transportation Business
Cheng Ka Sang as Ma Hung, second leader for the Sa bandits under Sa Tsun Tin
Bruce Li Hung Kit as Magistrate Lam
Wong Wai Leung as Hong Chi-Wing, Hong Po-kei's father
Paul Gare as Doctor Brown

Episodes

Production

Development and Casting
Before Lee Tim-sing began preparing for a new production, Sheren Tang approached Lee and explained that she wanted to work on a drama with him. Eager to work with Lee, Tang said that she was willing to accommodate her schedules for the new production. Tang also suggested Wayne Lai for the male lead role since she had never worked with him before and was eager to collaborate with him even though Lai had never been cast in a lead role for a TVB series prior to Rosy Business. At the time, Lai was already scheduled in a role in another drama but Lee negotiated with TVB to allow Lai to star in the lead role in Rosy Business. When both Tang's and Lai's scheduling were finalized, Lee began working on the production in early 2008. Along with producing coordinator Cheung Wah-biu, they submitted an initial script to Catherine Tsang, manager of TVB's production department. She was impressed with the script and development for the production formally began in July 2008. Claire Yiu, who was originally cast as Hoi Tong, dropped out of the project due to her pregnancy. Nancy Wu later replaced her. Susan Tse, who had just left rival network ATV and joined TVB, was cast in the project making it her first series with the network. Suet Nei was cast as Elliot Ngok's character's mother, despite Ngok being 3 years her senior.

A press conference and costume fitting for the cast was held on July 25, 2008 with the working title "Red Powder Merchant" (紅粉商人). Filming began August and ended four months later in November 2008 in Hong Kong. Lee explained that the production was temporarily called "Wives and Concubines" (妻妾成群) when the initial script was first submitted, but was later renamed to "Red Powder Merchant." Colleagues criticized the new working title, and Lee later finalized the official title to "Veiled Heroine, Ruthless Hero" (巾幗梟雄) and its official English title to Rosy Business. "Veiled Heroine" (巾幗) represented Tang's role of the fourth wife, while "Ruthless Hero" (梟雄) represented Lai's role 'Chai Kau'. A trailer was release at the sales presentation in December 2008. The drama was also sponsored by Bawang Shampoo.

Reception

Broadcast & Viewership
The drama aired in TVB's main TVB Jade channel for five days a week, from April 27 to May 29, 2009, with a total of 24 episodes. While production planned for 25 episodes, the two final episodes were aired together. A special Scoop watch party celebration, which took place at the Discovery Park Shopping Mall in Tsuen Wan and attended by hundreds including the cast, crew, TVB executives, and fans, aired during commercial breaks with the finale lasting for approximately two hours.

Before the broadcast of grand production anniversary drama Beyond the Realm of Conscience, Rosy Business was 2009's most viewed drama, with an average rating of 33 points (2.1 million viewers) per episode. The finale episode peaked to 47 rating points (3.3 million viewers; 3.4 million including TVB's HDTV sister channel), the second highest in 2009. The highest peak of average ratings in one week reached to 42 points (2.8 million viewers), also the second highest in 2009.

Critical Reception
Rosy Business has received commercial and critical acclaim in Hong Kong. While ratings went to as high as 47 points, critics claim that if the points included the viewers who watched the drama through TVB's HDTV and other sister networks, the rating results may have been comparative to the viewership success of Moonlight Resonance and Korean drama Jewel in the Palace, in which both dramas reached to a rating of 50 points. 

The roles of the "fourth wife" and "Chai Kau" propelled both Sheren Tang and Wayne Lai to stardom, particularly Lai who was a lesser known actor prior to Rosy Business' release since he had not yet played the first male lead in a significant series. His character's line "人生有幾多個十年?" meaning "How many decades are in one's life?" became an instant catchphrase in Hong Kong while his character Chai Kau became a recognized icon. The hype around Tang's acting in the series also became a noteworthy topic as many believed she had been snubbed from winning the Best Actress award back in 2004, causing a firestorm online with thousands of netizens threatening to protest in front of TVB City if she did not win the award this time around following rumours that TVB wanted to give Tavia Yeung the Best Actress award since Yeung was under full contract with the network. Yeung announced publicly at the awards show before the award was handed out that if Tang did not win, she would join the protest outside TVB headquarters. Ultimately, Tang and Lai both respectively won the title as Best Actress and Best Actor at the 2009 TVB Anniversary Awards.

The series also won the Best Drama Award over Beyond the Realm of Conscience, the other fan favourite that year. Additionally, the series swept all four MingPao Anniversary Awards: Best Actor for Lai, Best Actress for Tang, Best Programme, and Best Backstage Crew for writers Cheung Wah-biu and Chan Ching-yee. 
 
Rosy Business aired in Mainland China with mixed to positive reviews. Some viewers expressed that the story was similar to The Grand Mansion Gate, despite having a different plot, historical time period, and characters, and claimed that Hong Kong script writers were beginning to lack creativity, having remade a few Mainland dramas already in the past. Despite that, the series still garnered a high rating of 8.7 out of 10 on Chinese website Douban.

Time Out Hong Kong named Rosy Business among the best 17 Hong Kong television dramas of all time.

Sister Productions

No Regrets 

After the success of Rosy Business, TVB announced plans to produce a companion piece starring the original cast, slated to begin filming in March 2010. However, Fala Chen and Raymond Wong Ho-yin were cast to replace Kiki Sheung, Ron Ng, and Suki Chui, who were reported to be not taking part in the production due to scheduling conflicts.

Tentatively titled Rosy Business II (巾幗梟雄之義海豪情), a sales presentation trailer of the drama featuring a majority of the original cast was filmed on October 25, 2009 in TVB's filming studio. The three-minute trailer aired on the TVB Jade channel on December 6, 2009 to an overwhelmingly positive reception. 50 random locals were interviewed in the streets, and 58% chose Rosy Business II as their most anticipated drama. Several Mainland China news portals also listed Rosy Business II as one of the top 15 for most anticipating upcoming Hong Kong/Taiwanese dramas.

The reboot will take place during World War II in Guangzhou, approximately 100 years after the events of Rosy Business. Lee explained that Rosy Business II will take a darker route in introducing the main characters, having that Tang will portray a villainous role. While the original did not have Tang and Lai dwell in a romantic relationship, the spin-off will focus on these developments, but it will merely be a side-story to the main plot.

The indirect sequel, released on October 18, 2010 under the title No Regrets, was a huge success with the final episode reaching over 3 million live viewers and an additional 3.7 million views on TVB's online service MyTV, the highest ever in MyTV record. It currently holds a 9.4 rating on the Chinese website Douban, becoming the highest rated Hong Kong drama series of all time.

No Reserve 
After two successful hit series, talks of a third follow up series began to circulate in 2010 and was slated to start filming in April 2012 with the original cast and crew including Lai and Tang. However, the project fell through when writer Cheung Wah Biu left TVB and Lee stated that he is unable to make another without Cheung. After multiple delays, TVB confirmed in September 2012 that the project will begin filming in March 2013 with a new writer and with Myolie Wu cast as the new female lead replacing Sheren Tang after Lee stated that he was unable to create another story with the same two leads. This decision was heavily criticized by the public with fans stating that Tang was irreplaceable and threatening boycott. Most of the supporting cast also left the project due to scheduling conflicts and producers wanting a younger cast.

The series was put in limbo for three years due to content that was deemed too controversial by TVB. It was finally released in 2016 as No Reserve under a low profile and with several episodes cut from television and only released on myTV. It was negatively received with viewership averaging 20 points and a 4.2 out of 10 rating on Douban, a far contrast with both its predecessors.

No Return 
In November 2020, sources stated that a fourth sequel will begin filming in March 2021 with Sheren Tang returning as the female lead. New creator Fong Chun Chiu stated that while there have been talks, nothing had been confirmed. Wayne Lai was asked about the news in December 2020 and said that he hopes to work with Tang again but did not confirm or deny anything. In January 2021, a fan commented on Tang's Weibo that watching No Regrets helped improve their Cantonese listening skills to which Tang replied "Want to improve even more?" seemingly hinting at her involvement in the project. Later, Lai confirmed that Tang has joined the project and that Cheung Wah Biu is returning as screenwriter marking his return to TVB for the first time since working on No Regrets in 2010. Lai also said that production has been delayed due to COVID-19 pandemic travel restrictions.

In late April 2021, it was reported that Rebecca Zhu and Him Law have joined the cast with production set to start in August 2021 in Hengdian. However, as of June 2021, Lai told fans that he does not know when production will begin.

On July 19, 2021, news outlets reported that collaborations with Chinese company Youku had fallen apart after the company read the first 3 episodes of the script. TVB has the script under review but the project may not move forward. It was also reported that Tang had moved on to seeking new projects but Lai later said the project is still in development.

In late August to September 2021, multiple reports claimed the drama will move forward with production set to start in March 2022 but this was never confirmed. On October 18, 2021, Tang hosted a livestream with Lai to celebrate the 11th anniversary of the 2nd instalment No Regrets with over 1.35 million people joining. Tang confirmed that she did have the project in her schedule before but due to some problems, she decided not to talk about it so openly. Recognizing the overwhelming excitement over the potential sequel, they emphasized how much they also want to collaborate again and will try their hardest to make it happen but if they cannot be involved in the end, there will be other opportunities.

On 28 January 2022, Lai said the project is still in progress and he hopes to film at the end of the year.

On 14 March 2022, TVB officially announced the drama as 1 of 4 sequels and 1 of 14 dramas in pre-production at the FILMART event under the Chinese title "巾幗梟雄之懸崖" and English title No Return. The series will reportedly have 30 episodes.

Awards and nominations

Viewership ratings

References

External links
TVB.com Rosy Business - Official Website 
Batgwa.com - News on Costume Fitting 

TVB dramas
Television series set in the Qing dynasty
2009 Hong Kong television series debuts
2009 Hong Kong television series endings